Scott Woolley (born September 7, 1960) is an American television producer. In 1991, after working and operating his grocery chain for twelve years, he founded Five Star Productions, a film and video production company. Through his company, Woolley produced 23 television shows since 1992. In 2009, he was a producer for William Shatner's Gonzo Ballet.

Early life and education 
Woolley was born in Queens, and grew up in Smithtown, Long Island. At the age of 10 Woolley started working in his family grocery store chain, Foodtown (United States).  When he was fifteen, his family moved to Oyster Bay Cove, New York where he attended St. Dominic High School. Later Woolley attended St. John's University.

Career 
In 1983, Woolley founded the grocery chain Woolley's Fine Foods with his father in Boca Raton, Florida. By 1991 Woolley's was a chain of 42 stores. In 2005, Woolley, supporting John Capra and John Paul DeJoria launched John Paul Pet, a company which produces grooming products for pets based on the John Paul Mitchell Systems brand.  In 2009 Woolley sold his daily television series on the Lifetime Television Network, closing Five Star  and launched a new Entertainment & Marketing company The SW Group.

Woolley is also a founding member of the Founder's Club for FAU football.

Five Star Productions 
Woolley started with video production while he was experimenting ways to keep the customers at his family's grocery store entertained while they were waiting in line. He did this by mounting television sets on the ceiling and playing instructional and cooking shows on them. In 1992, he co-founded Five Star Productions USA Inc., a film and video production company. Woolley developed his first production, Flight, after noticing the large number of available aviation magazines, and noting the variety of articles and advertisements about everything from airports to propellers. The show was telecast of SportChannel America for 13 episodes.

The production company started with three people working out of a small office in Boca Raton. By 1993, the company had grown and was employing 20 people, when Woolley formed a partnership with John Paul DeJoria and subsequently the company grew even further. In 1993, the company produced Today`s Environment hosted by Ed Begley Jr., a show that profiled what businesses had done to protect the environment. The show was telecast on CNBC as well as the Discovery Channel. The company produced Business First in 1998. In the show, Jack Kemp interviewed corporate executives. Other shows produced by the company included produced Today's Health with Faith Daniels, Parenting and Beyond hosted by Kim Alexis, The Best of Wine and Food with George Hamilton, The Next Millenium with Peter Weller, Football Playbook and Teen Scene. In 2003 Woolley created The Balancing Act, a 30-minute weekly series that aired on the Lifetime Television network hosted by Joanna Kerns.

Woolley helped develop a child safety program with the Palm Beach County Sheriff's Department called the Call-A-Cop As part of the program, cards pairing deputies with athletes and celebrities were prepared. The card also listed statistics of the celebrity and the deputy as well as the phone number of the featured deputy. Woolley helped with the photo shoots as well as in designing the cards and gathering all the athletes and celebrities.

In 1998, Woolley expanded into radio by creating the nationally syndicated, weekly program Inside the NHL hosted by John Davidson,  and Jeff Rimer. Since 1992 twenty-three television series’, and entertainment specials, films, corporate videos and  music specials have been produced and created under Woolley's direction by Five Star. Five Star is responsible for writing, producing and directing its shows as well as obtaining sponsors. The company created a sister firm in February 2000 by investing in a digital-technology operation, allowing Five Star to do its own editing.

Awards 
In 1999, Woolley received the Ernst & Young Entrepreneur of the Year Award for Florida. Woolley and his productions have been the recipient of industry awards including three Emmys, ADDY Awards and Aurora Awards.

Filmography

As a producer

References

External links 
The SW Group

Film producers from New York (state)
Living people
1960 births
People from Queens, New York
People from Smithtown, New York
People from Oyster Bay Cove, New York